Manuel Eduardo González Mejías (born 8 March 1992) is a Venezuelan football manager.

Career
Born in Barquisimeto, González played as a youth for Deportivo Lara before retiring from football at the age of just 18 to become a coach. He then worked as a coordinator at Academia Rey before returning to Deportivo Lara in the methodology department. 

In 2019, González coached the youth setup of Yaracuy before returning to Deportivo Lara in July 2020. Ahead of the 2021 campaign, he was appointed assistant manager of Yaracuyanos.

On 24 September 2021, González was named manager of Yaracuyanos in the place of Tony Franco.

References

External links

1992 births
Living people
Sportspeople from Barquisimeto
Venezuelan football managers
Venezuelan Primera División managers
Yaracuyanos F.C. managers